H. L. Hunley, often referred to as Hunley,  CSS H. L. Hunley, or as CSS Hunley, was a submarine of the Confederate States of America that played a small part in the American Civil War. Hunley demonstrated the advantages and the dangers of undersea warfare. She was the first combat submarine to sink a warship, although Hunley was not completely submerged and, following her successful attack, was lost along with her crew before she could return to base. The Confederacy lost 21 crewmen in three sinkings of Hunley during her short career. She was named for her inventor, Horace Lawson Hunley, shortly after she was taken into government service under the control of the Confederate States Army at Charleston, South Carolina.

She was then shipped by rail on 12 August 1863, to Charleston. Hunley (then referred to as the "fish boat", the "fish torpedo boat", or the "porpoise") sank on 29 August 1863, during a test run, killing five members of her crew. She sank again on 15 October 1863, killing all eight of her second crew, including Horace Lawson Hunley himself, who was aboard at the time, even though he was not a member of the Confederate military. Both times Hunley was raised and returned to service.

On 17 February 1864, Hunley attacked and sank the 1,240-ton United States Navy screw sloop-of-war Housatonic, which had been on Union blockade-duty in Charleston's outer harbor. Hunley did not survive the attack and also sank, taking with her all eight members of her third crew, and was lost.

Finally located in 1995, Hunley was raised in 2000, and is on display in North Charleston, South Carolina, at the Warren Lasch Conservation Center on the Cooper River.

Predecessors 
Horace Lawson Hunley provided financing for James McClintock to design three submarines:  in New Orleans, Louisiana,  built in Mobile, and  Hunley.

While the United States Navy was constructing its first submarine , in late 1861, the Confederacy were doing so as well. Hunley, McClintock, and Baxter Watson first built  Pioneer, which was tested in February 1862, in the Mississippi River, and was later towed to Lake Pontchartrain, for additional trials. But the Union advance towards New Orleans caused the men to abandon development and scuttle Pioneer the following month. The Bayou St. John Confederate submarine may have been constructed about this time.
Hunley and McClintock moved to Mobile, to begin development of a second submarine, American Diver with the collaboration of two others. Their efforts were supported by the Confederate States Army. Lieutenant William Alexander of the 21st Alabama Infantry Regiment was assigned to oversee the project. The builders experimented with electric and steam propulsion for the new submarine, before falling back on a simple hand-cranked propulsion system. American Diver was ready for harbor trials by January 1863, but she proved too slow to be practical. Nonetheless, it was decided to tow the submarine down the bay to Fort Morgan and attempt an attack on the Union blockade. However, the submarine foundered in the heavy chop caused by foul weather and the currents at the mouth of Mobile Bay and sank. The crew escaped, but the boat was not recovered.

Construction and testing 

Construction of Hunley began soon after the loss of American Diver. At this stage, Hunley was variously referred to as the "fish boat", the "fish torpedo boat", or the "porpoise". Legend held that Hunley was made from a cast-off steam boiler—perhaps because a cutaway drawing by William Alexander, who had seen her, showed a short and stubby machine. In fact, Hunley was designed and built for her role, and the sleek, modern-looking craft shown in R.G. Skerrett's 1902 drawing is an accurate representation. Each end was equipped with ballast tanks that could be flooded by valves or pumped dry by hand pumps. Extra ballast was added through the use of iron weights bolted to the underside of the hull. In the event the submarine needed additional buoyancy to rise in an emergency, the iron weight could be removed by unscrewing the heads of the bolts from inside the vessel.

Hunley was equipped with two watertight hatches, one forward and one aft, atop two short conning towers equipped with small portholes and slender, triangular cutwaters.

By July 1863, Hunley was ready for a demonstration. Supervised by Confederate Admiral Franklin Buchanan, Hunley successfully attacked a coal flatboat in Mobile Bay. Following this, the submarine was shipped by rail to Charleston, South Carolina, arriving on 12 August 1863.

However, the Confederate military seized the submarine from her private builders and owners shortly after arriving, turning her over to the Confederate Army. Hunley would operate as a Confederate Army vessel from then on, although Horace Hunley and his partners would remain involved in her further testing and operation. While sometimes referred to as CSS Hunley, she was never officially commissioned into service.

Confederate Navy Lieutenant John A. Payne of CSS Chicora volunteered to be Hunleys captain, and seven men from Chicora and CSS Palmetto State volunteered to operate her. On 29 August 1863, Hunleys new crew was preparing to make a test dive, when Lieutenant Payne accidentally stepped on the lever controlling the sub's diving planes as she was running on the surface. This caused Hunley to dive with one of her hatches still open. Payne and two others escaped, but the other five crewmen drowned.
H. L. Hunley crew lost 29 August 1863:
Michael Cane
Nicholas Davis
Frank Doyle
John Kelly
Absolum Williams

The Confederate Army took control of Hunley, with all orders coming directly from General P. G. T. Beauregard, with Lt. George E. Dixon placed in charge.  On 15 October 1863, Hunley failed to surface after a mock attack, killing all eight crewmen. Among these was Hunley himself, who had joined the crew for the exercise and possibly had taken over command from Dixon, for the attack maneuver. The Confederate Navy once more salvaged the submarine and returned her to service.
H. L. Hunley Crew lost 15 October 1863:
Horace Hunley
Thomas S. Parks
Henry Beard.
R. Brookbanks
John Marshall
Charles McHugh
Joseph Patterson
Charles L. Sprague

Armament 

Hunley was originally intended to attack by using a floating explosive charge with a contact fuse (a torpedo in 19th century terminology) which was towed at the end of a long rope. Hunley was to approach an enemy ship on the surface, then dive under her, and surface again once beyond her. The torpedo would be drawn against the targeted ship and explode. This plan was discarded as dangerous because of the possibility of the tow line fouling Hunleys screw or drifting into the submarine herself.

Instead, a spar torpedo—a copper cylinder containing  of black powder—was attached to a -long wooden spar, as seen in illustrations made at this time. Previous spar torpedoes had been designed with a barbed point: the spar torpedo would be jammed in the target's side by ramming, and then detonated by a mechanical trigger attached to the submarine by a line, so that as she backed away from her target, the torpedo would set off. However, archaeologists working on Hunley discovered evidence, including a spool of copper wire and components of a battery, that it may actually have been electrically detonated. In the configuration used in the attack on Housatonic, it appears Hunleys torpedo had no barbs, and was designed to explode on contact as it was pushed against an enemy vessel at close range. After Horace Hunley's death, General Beauregard ordered that the submarine should no longer be used to attack underwater. An iron pipe was then attached to her bow, angled downwards so the explosive charge would be delivered sufficiently under water to make it effective. This was the same method developed for the earlier "David" surface attack craft used successfully against the USS New Ironsides. The Confederate Veteran of 1902, printed a reminiscence authored by an engineer stationed at Battery Marshall who, with another engineer, made adjustments to the iron pipe mechanism before Hunley left on her last fatal mission on 17 February 1864. A drawing of the iron pipe spar, confirming her "David" type configuration, was published in early histories of submarine warfare.

Attack on Housatonic 

Hunley made her only attack against an enemy target on the night of 17 February 1864.
Desperate to break the naval blockade of the city, Lieutenant George E. Dixon, and a crew of seven volunteers  successfully attacked Housatonic, ramming Hunleys only spar torpedo against the enemy's hull. The torpedo was detonated, sending Housatonic to the bottom in five minutes, along with five of her crewmen.

Years later, when the area around the wreck of Housatonic was surveyed, the sunken Hunley was found on the seaward side of the sloop, where no one had considered looking before. This later indicated that the ocean current was going out following the attack on Housatonic, taking Hunley with her to where she was eventually found and later recovered.

Disappearance 

After the attack, H.L. Hunley failed to return to her base. At one point there appeared to be evidence that Hunley survived as long as one hour following the attack, which occurred at about 20:45. The day after the attack, the commander of "Battery Marshall" reported that he had received "the signals" from the submarine indicating she was returning to her base. The report did not say what the signals were. A postwar correspondent wrote that "two blue lights" were the prearranged signals, and a lookout on Housatonic reported he saw a "blue light" on the water after his ship sank. "Blue light" in 1864 referred to a pyrotechnic signal in long use by the U.S. Navy. It has been falsely represented in published works as a blue lantern; the lantern eventually found on the recovered H. L. Hunley had a clear, not a blue, lens. Pyrotechnic "blue light" could be seen easily over the  distance between Battery Marshall and the site of Hunleys attack on Housatonic.

After signalling, Dixon's plan could have been to take his submarine underwater to make a return to Sullivan's Island, although he left no confirmed documentation of this plan. At one point the finders of Hunley suggested she was unintentionally rammed by USS Canandaigua when that warship was going to rescue the crew of Housatonic, but no such damage was found when she was raised from the bottom of the harbor. Instead, all evidence and analysis eventually pointed to the instantaneous death of Hunleys entire crew at the moment of the spar torpedo's contact with the hull of Housatonic. Upon removal of the silt inside the hull, the skeletons of the crewmembers were found seated at their stations, with no signs of skeletal trauma. In October 2008, scientists reported they had found that the crew of Hunley had not set her pump to remove water from the crew's compartment, and this might indicate she was not flooded until after they died. In January 2013, it was announced that conservator Paul Mardikian had found evidence of a copper sleeve at the end of Hunleys spar. In 2018, researchers reported that the keel blocks, which the crew could release from inside the vessel to allow the sub to surface quickly in an emergency, had never been released.

The short distance between the torpedo and the vessel, in addition to the signs that the crew died instantaneously and without a struggle to survive, led a team of blast trauma specialists from Duke University to theorize that the Hunleys crew was killed by the blast itself, which could have transmitted pressure waves inside the vessel without damaging its hull. Their research, which included scaled experiments with live black powder bombs, provided data indicating the crew was likely killed by the explosion of their own torpedo, which could have caused immediate pulmonary blast trauma. The Duke team's experiments and results were published August 2017 in the peer-reviewed journal PLoS One and eventually became the subject of the book In the Waves: My Quest to Solve the Mystery of a Civil War Submarine. Although their conclusions have been disputed by archaeologists with the Naval History and Heritage Command (NHHC), the NHCC website disputing the results of the scientific experiments contains several inconsistencies. For example, the website implies that the experiments are not valid because "a 1/8th inch plate at 1/6th scale is only 0.02 inches thick," but neither of these dimensions are relevant to either the original Hunley or the scale model used by Duke.

Recovery of wreckage 

Hunleys discovery was described by Dr. William Dudley, Director of Naval History at the Naval Historical Center as "probably the most important find of the century." The tiny sub and her contents have been valued at more than $40 million, making her discovery and subsequent donation one of the most important and valuable contributions made to South Carolina.

The discovery of Hunley has been claimed by two different individuals. Underwater archaeologist E. Lee Spence, president, Sea Research Society, reportedly discovered Hunley in 1970, and has a collection of evidence claiming to validate this, including a 1980 Civil Admiralty Case. The court took the position that the wreck was outside the jurisdiction of the U.S. Marshals Office, and no determination of ownership was made.

On 13 September 1976, the National Park Service submitted Sea Research Society's (Spence's) location for H. L. Hunley for inclusion on the National Register of Historic Places. Spence's location for Hunley became a matter of public record when H. L. Hunleys placement on that list was officially approved on 29 December 1978. Spence's book Treasures of the Confederate Coast, which had a chapter on his discovery of Hunley and included a map complete with an "X" showing the wreck's location, was published in January 1995.

The submarine was buried under several feet of silt, which had both concealed and protected the vessel for more than a hundred years. The divers exposed the forward hatch and the ventilator box (the air box for the attachment of her twin snorkels) in order to identify her. Archaeologists exposed part of the ship's port side and uncovered the bow dive plane.

On 14 September 1995, at the official request of Senator Glenn F. McConnell, Chairman, South Carolina Hunley Commission, E. Lee Spence, with South Carolina Attorney General Charles M. Condon signing, donated Hunley to the State of South Carolina. Shortly thereafter, NUMA disclosed to government officials Wilbank's location for the wreck which, when finally made public in October 2000, matched Spence's 1970s plot of the wreck's location well within standard mapping tolerances. Spence avows that he discovered Hunley in 1970, revisiting and mapping the site in 1971 and again in 1979, and that after he published the location in his 1995 book he expected NUMA to independently verify the wreck as Hunley, not to claim that NUMA had discovered her. NUMA was actually part of a SCIAA expedition directed by Dr. Mark M. Newell and not Cussler. Dr. Newell swore under oath that he used Spence's maps to direct the joint SCIAA/NUMA expedition and credited Spence with the original discovery. Dr. Newell credits his expedition only with the official verification of Hunley.

The in situ underwater archaeological investigation and excavation culminated with the raising of Hunley on 8 August 2000. A large team of professionals from the Naval Historical Center's Underwater Archaeology Branch, National Park Service, the South Carolina Institute of Archaeology and Anthropology, and various other individuals investigated the vessel, measuring and documenting her prior to removal. Once the on-site investigation was complete, harnesses were slipped underneath the sub and attached to a truss designed by Oceaneering International. After the last harness had been secured, the crane from the recovery barge Karlissa B hoisted the submarine from the sea floor. On 8 August 2000, at 08:37, the sub broke the surface for the first time in more than 136 years, greeted by a cheering crowd on shore and in surrounding watercraft, including author Clive Cussler. Once safely on her transporting barge, Hunley was shipped back to Charleston. The removal operation concluded when the submarine was secured inside the Warren Lasch Conservation Center, at the former Charleston Navy Yard in North Charleston, in a specially designed tank of fresh water to await conservation until she could eventually be exposed to air.

The exploits of Hunley and her final recovery were the subject of an episode of the television series The Sea Hunters, called Hunley: First Kill. This program was based on a section ("Part 6") in Clive Cussler's 1996 non-fiction book of the same name (which was accepted by the Board of Governors of the Maritime College of the State University of New York in lieu of his Ph.D. thesis).

In 2001, Clive Cussler, filed a lawsuit against E. Lee Spence, for unfair competition, injurious falsehood, civil conspiracy, and defamation. Spence filed a countersuit against Cussler, in 2002, seeking damages, claiming that Cussler was engaging in unfair competition, tortious interference, and civil conspiracy by claiming Cussler had discovered the location of the wreck of Hunley in 1995, when she had already been discovered by Spence in 1970, and that such claims by Cussler were damaging to Spence's career, and had caused him damages in excess of $100,000. Spence's lawsuit was dismissed through summary judgment in 2007, on the legal theory that, under the Lanham Act, regardless of whether Cussler's claims were factual or not, Cussler had been making them for over three years before Spence brought his suit against Cussler, and thus the suit was not filed within the statute of limitations. Cussler dropped his suit a year later, after the judge agreed that Spence could introduce evidence in support of his discovery claims as a truth defense against Cussler's claims against him.

Hunley may be viewed during tours at the Warren Lasch Conservation Center, in Charleston.

Crew 

The crew was composed of Lieutenant George E. Dixon (Commander) (of Alabama or Ohio), Frank Collins (of Virginia), Joseph F. Ridgaway (of Maryland), James A. Wicks (North Carolina native living in Florida), Arnold Becker (of Germany), Corporal Johan Frederik Carlsen (of Denmark), C. Lumpkin (probably of the British Isles), and Augustus Miller (probably a former member of the German Artillery).

Apart from the commander of the submarine, Lieutenant George E. Dixon, the identities of the volunteer crewmen of Hunley had long remained a mystery. Douglas Owsley, a physical anthropologist working for the Smithsonian Institution's National Museum of Natural History, examined the remains and determined that four of the men were American born, while the four others were of European birth, based on the chemical signatures left on the men's teeth and bones by the predominant components of their diet. Four of the men had eaten plenty of corn, an American diet, while the remainder ate mostly wheat and rye, a mainly European one. By examining Civil War records and conducting DNA testing with possible relatives, forensic genealogist Linda Abrams, was able to identify the remains of Dixon, and the three other Americans: Frank G. Collins of Fredericksburg, Va., Joseph Ridgaway, and James A. Wicks. Identifying the European crewmen has been more problematic, but was apparently solved in late 2004. The position of the remains indicated that the men died at their stations and were not trying to escape from the sinking submarine.

On 17 April 2004, the remains of the crew were laid to rest at Magnolia Cemetery, in Charleston. Tens of thousands of people attended including some 6,000 reenactors and 4,000 civilians wearing period clothing. Color guards from all five branches of the U.S. armed forces—wearing modern uniforms—were also in the procession. Even though only two of the crew were from the Confederate States, all were buried with full Confederate honors, including being buried with the 2nd Confederate national flag, known as the Stainless Banner.

Another surprise occurred in 2002, when lead researcher Maria Jacobsen, examining the area close to Lieutenant Dixon, found a misshapen $20 gold piece, minted in 1860, with the inscription "Shiloh April 6, 1862 My life Preserver G. E. D." on a sanded-smooth area of the coin's reverse side, and a forensic anthropologist found a healed injury to Lt. Dixon's hip bone. The findings matched a legend, passed down in the family, that Dixon's sweetheart, Queenie Bennett, had given him the coin to protect him. However, the supposed relationship between Bennett and Dixon has not been supported by archaeological investigation of the legend. Dixon had the coin with him at the Battle of Shiloh, where he was wounded in the thigh on 6 April 1862. The bullet struck the coin in his pocket, saving his leg and possibly his life. He had the gold coin engraved and carried it as a lucky charm.

A.J. Kronegh, of the Danish National Archive, has identified the J.F. Carlsen of Hunley. Johan F. Carlsen, was born in Ærøskøbing 9 April 1841. The last year he is registered in the census of Ærøskøbing is 1860, where he is registered as "sailor". The teeth of his remains in Hunley still bear significant marks of a cobbler, which was the profession of his father. In 1861, J.F. Carlsen entered the freight ship Grethe of Dragør, which landed in Charleston, in February 1861, where J.F. Carlsen left (deserted) the ship. In June 1861, he entered Jefferson Davis (the Confederate privateer brig originally named Putnam) as mate.

Tours 
Visitors can obtain tickets for guided tours of the conservation laboratory that houses Hunley, at the Warren Lasch Conservation Center, on weekends. The actual Hunley is preserved and on display in a tank of water, while a replica can be entered by the public. The Center includes artifacts found inside Hunley, exhibits about the submarine and a video.

In popular culture 
Hunleys story was the subject of the first episode (entitled "The Hunley") of the TV series The Great Adventure. It aired on 27 September 1963, on CBS. The role of Lt. Dixon (misspelled in the credits as "Lt. Dickson") was played by Jackie Cooper.
The original TNT Network made-for-cable movie The Hunley (1999) tells the story of H. L. Hunleys final mission while on station in Charleston. It stars Armand Assante, as Lt. Dixon, and Donald Sutherland, as General Beauregard, Dixon's direct superior on the Hunley project.
Hunley is the inspiration of the Sons of Confederate Veterans, H. L. Hunley JROTC Award, presented to cadets on the basis of strong corps values, honor, courage, and commitment to their unit during the school year.
In the novel The Stingray Shuffle by Tim Dorsey, a minor drug cartel decides to emulate the larger cartels' narco-submarine cocaine trafficking by building a replica of Hunley using blueprints downloaded off the Internet.
The story of the Duke University experiments that concluded the Hunley crew died of pulmonary blast trauma became the subject of the non-fiction book In the Waves: My Quest to Solve the Mystery of a Civil War Submarine by Rachel Lance (2020).

See also 

  – U. S. Navy submarine launched a year before Hunley
 The American Turtle –  built in 1775, the world's first submersible with a documented record of use in combat
 French submarine Plongeur – launched a few months before Hunley
 Peral Submarine – 1888 submarine from Spain, the first to be powered by electric batteries

References

Citations

Bibliography
 The H. L. Hunley: The Secret Hope of the Confederacy by Tom Chaffin (Farrar, Straus and Giroux, 2008), 
 The Hunley: Submarines, Sacrifice & Success in the Civil War by Mark Ragan (Narwhal Press, Charleston/Miami, 1995), 
 Ghosts from the Coast, "The Man Who Found the Hunley" by Nancy Roberts, UNC Press, 2001, 
 Treasures of the Confederate Coast: the "real Rhett Butler" & Other Revelations by Dr. E. Lee Spence, (Narwhal Press, Charleston/Miami, 1995), 
 Civil War Sub 
 The Voyage of the Hunley, 
 Raising the Hunley, 
 The CSS H. L. Hunley, 
 The CSS Hunley, 
 Shipwreck Encyclopedia of the Civil War: South Carolina & Georgia, 1861–1865 by Edward Lee Spence (Sullivan's Island, S. C., Shipwreck Press, 1991) OCLC: 24420089
 Shipwrecks of South Carolina and Georgia: (includes Spence's List, 1520–1865) Sullivan's Island, S. C. (Sullivan's Island 29482, Sea Research Society, 1984)
 Shipwrecks of the Civil War : Charleston, South Carolina, 1861–1865 map by E. Lee Spence (Sullivan's Island, S. C., 1984)

External links 

 
 Friends of the Hunley – includes visiting information
 
 
 Pre-Hunley – Confederate Submarines
 The Hunley (TV movie)
 Rootsweb
 Hunley – Archaeological Interpretation and 3D Reconstruction
 
 
 H.L. Hunley article, Encyclopedia of Alabama
 An Interview with Dr. Lee Spence – Discoverer of the Confederate Submarine HL Hunley

Submarines of the Confederate States Navy
Shipwrecks of the Carolina coast
Shipwrecks on the National Register of Historic Places in South Carolina
Shipwrecks of the American Civil War
Maritime incidents in February 1864
Archaeological sites in South Carolina
Ships built in Mobile, Alabama
North Charleston, South Carolina
1863 ships
American Civil War museums in South Carolina
Museum ships in South Carolina
National Register of Historic Places in North Charleston, South Carolina
Warships lost in combat with all hands
American Civil War on the National Register of Historic Places
Hand-cranked submarines
Submarine accidents
Maritime incidents in August 1863
Maritime incidents in October 1863